Actinoplanes lichenis is a bacterium from the genus Actinoplanes which has been isolated from lichen in Thailand.

References

External links
Type strain of Actinoplanes lichenis at BacDive -  the Bacterial Diversity Metadatabase

Micromonosporaceae
Bacteria described in 2016